Constellation International Airlines was a Belgian airline that operated during the 1990s.

Code data
IATA Code: CQ
ICAO Code: CIN
Callsign: CONSTELLATION

History
Constellation International Airlines S.A., was established on 27 May 1978 as Unijet, rebranded as BFS International on 28 October 1981 and renamed to the last name on 7 February 1995. Started operations, with Boeing 727-200 aircraft from Brussels Airport on 23 June 1995, which were replaced by brand new Airbus A320 aircraft, leased from International Lease Finance Corporation. Constellation International Airlines was the first company in the Benelux to operate the Airbus A320 family series aircraft. Its markets were holiday flights and subservices for other companies, when the need arose. Constellation International Airlines ceased operations due to financial troubles on 3 December 1999, and was declared bankrupt on 15 December 1999.

Fleet

The Constellation Airlines historical fleet consisted of the following aircraft:

2 Airbus A320-232 (registrations: OO-COF and OO-COH)
1 Airbus A320-231 (registration: OO-COL)
1 Airbus A321-231 (registration: G-MIDA)
2 Boeing 727-2X3 (registrations: OO-LLS and OO-CAH)
2 Boeing 737-3H9 (registrations: YU-ANI and YU-ANK)

References

External links

Code and fleet data
In Memoriam

Defunct airlines of Belgium
Airlines established in 1995
Airlines disestablished in 1999
Belgian companies established in 1995
1999 disestablishments in Belgium